City of Chicago v. Morales, 527 U.S. 41 (1999), is a United States Supreme Court case in which the Court held that a law cannot be so vague that a person of ordinary intelligence can not figure out what is innocent activity and what is illegal.

Background 
Under the Chicago Municipal Code § 8-4-015 (added June 17, 1992), loitering was a crime.

The facts of the case were:

More specifically, "In 1993, Jesus Morales was arrested and found guilty under the ordinance for loitering in a Chicago neighborhood after he ignored police orders to disperse. Ultimately, after Morales challenged his arrest, the Illinois Supreme Court held that the ordinance violated due process of law in that it is impermissibly vague on its face and an arbitrary restriction on personal liberties."  The United States Supreme Court affirmed the Supreme Court of Illinois' judgment.

Issue and holding
The only issue on certiorari was whether the ordinance was unconstitutionally vague, either on its face or as applied, in violation of "the Due Process Clause of the Fourteenth Amendment to the U.S. Constitution."

The United States Supreme Court held in this case that a law cannot be so vague that a person of ordinary intelligence cannot figure out what is innocent activity and what is illegal.

Rationale
Justice John Paul Stevens, writing for the plurality, said that the:

Six justices ultimately sided with Morales, and three with the City of Chicago.  However, only three justices agreed on all of the rationales and the complete holding, namely Stevens, Souter, and Ginsburg.  O'Connor, Kennedy, and Breyer had concurring opinions.  One particular "sticking point" was whether "It is a criminal law that contains no mens rea requirement ... and infringes on constitutionally protected rights...."  Only Stevens, joined by Justice Souter and Justice Ginsburg, could agree on that.

Impact
The ACLU claimed a win in this case.

References

External links
 
 Law review article

1999 in United States case law
American Civil Liberties Union litigation
Chicago Police Department
United States statutory interpretation case law
United States Supreme Court cases
United States Supreme Court cases of the Rehnquist Court
Void for vagueness case law